Gradina Donja  is a village in the municipality of Kozarska Dubica, Republika Srpska, Bosnia and Herzegovina.

See also
 Donja Gradina Memorial Site - Information Portal to European on MemorialMuseums

References

Populated places in Dubica, Bosnia and Herzegovina